Michael Rolando Richards (August 2, 1963 – September 11, 2001) was an African-American sculptor of Jamaican and Costa Rican ancestry who was killed during the September 11 attacks while in his art studio on the 92nd Floor of the World Trade Center's North Tower. He explored his African-American history and identity through sculpture, conceptual art, and installation pieces. Influenced by the Black Arts Movement of the 1970s, Richards delved into African-American history and folklore for images that would expose the contradictions of American society. Richards worked primarily in bronze.

Early life
Richards was born in Brooklyn, New York, and raised in Kingston, Jamaica. He graduated with honors from Excelsior High School and earned a Bachelor of Fine Arts from Queens College and a Master of Arts from New York University.

Career
Richards was an African-American sculptor of Jamaican and Costa Rican ancestry. He explored his African-American history and identity through sculpture, conceptual art, and installation pieces. Influenced by the Black Arts Movement of the 1970s, Richards delved into African-American history and folklore for images that would expose the contradictions of American society. Richards worked primarily in bronze.

He was an artist-in-residence at the Studio Museum in Harlem in 1996 and showed his work there in "Passages" in 1999. Richards received several fellowships during his lifetime. In 2000, he received the Franconia Sculpture Park / Jerome Fellowship.  It was during this time that he created the "Are You Down" piece that is now displayed in the park.  He was also a recipient of a studio residency from the Lower Manhattan Cultural Council. This fellowship provided him with his "Studio in the Sky" in the World Trade Center.

His first work, entitled Are You Down, is located in Franconia, Minnesota, at Franconia Sculpture Park. Franconia Sculpture Park is a community arts organization that provides residence and work space to emerging and established artists.  Are You Down featured three sculptures of Tuskegee Airmen and was best described by Glenn Gordon: 
... a tableau of three nearly life-sized human figures. Three parachutists fallen from the sky, they sit disconsolate on the ground in what appear (once the snow has melted to reveal them) to be puddles of tar. Backs turned to one another, the figures form a triangle about twelve feet on a side. Within the triangle is a large bulls-eye flat on the ground, the target where the men had aimed to land. Their heads clad in close-fitting leather aviator helmets, their shirts torn from the drop, the figures represent three downed aviators from the storied, all-black Tuskegee Airmen's Squadron of the Second World War, men whose images Richards (using himself as his model) returned to in his work obsessively, again and again. They speak not so much of the exhilaration of flight as of dreams of freedom crashed to Earth.

Though originally cast in fiberglass, it was recast in bronze in 2012. to serve as a permanent memorial to Richards and his work. This has made it the only permanent sculpture in the park.

Richards's 1999 sculpture Tar Baby vs. St. Sebastian featured a Tuskegee Airman portrayed as St. Sebastian and was a part of his "Tuskegee Airmen Collection" that he spent over ten years creating. St. Sebastian was an early Christian martyr and the patron saint of soldiers and athletes because of his physical endurance. St. Sebastian was executed by being shot full of arrows for protecting captured Christians he was supposed to imprison. However, in this sculpture, it was a Tuskegee Airman who was being pierced by multiple airplanes. Tar Baby vs. St. Sebastian measures seven feet tall and is made out of resin and steel. Richards actually cast his own body in plastic resin to create this sculpture and others. Tar Baby vs. St. Sebastian is currently located at the North Carolina Museum of Art in Raleigh, North Carolina, and was initially presented in the show Passages: Contemporary Art in Transition by Deidre Scott. It was this work that led to Richards being considered the "most prolific artist to come through The Studio Museum A-I-R program" by Franklin Sirmans.

In 2021, the Museum of Contemporary Art North Miami exhibited career retrospective called "Michael Richards: Are You Down?" to run through the 20th anniversary of the World Trade Center attack.

Death
Richards was killed on September 11, 2001, during the World Trade Center attack while in his art studio on the 92nd Floor of the World Trade Center's North Tower. The Michael Richards Fund was created to support artists of Caribbean descent.

References

1963 births
2001 deaths
New York University alumni
Victims of the September 11 attacks
American terrorism victims
Terrorism deaths in New York (state)
People murdered in New York City
Male murder victims
Jamaican emigrants to the United States
Filmed killings
20th-century American sculptors
20th-century American male artists
American male sculptors
African-American sculptors
20th-century African-American artists
21st-century African-American politicians
21st-century American politicians